Depressaria deverrella is a moth of the family Depressariidae. It is found in Algeria and France.

The wingspan is 15–19 mm.

The larvae feed on the flowers of Deverra scoparia and Deverra tortuosa.

References

External links
lepiforum.de

Moths described in 1915
Depressaria
Moths of Europe
Moths of Africa